Turkey competed at the 2016 Summer Olympics in Rio de Janeiro, Brazil, from 5 to 21 August 2016. Since the nation's debut in 1908, Turkish athletes have appeared in every edition of the Summer Olympic Games, except for three occasions. Turkey failed to register any athletes at the 1920 Summer Olympics in Antwerp, did not attend the 1932 Summer Olympics in Los Angeles at the period of worldwide Great Depression, and also joined the United States-led boycott, when Moscow hosted the 1980 Summer Olympics. The Turkish team consisted of 103 athletes, 55 men and 48 women, across twenty-one sports.

Turkey returned home from Rio de Janeiro with eight medals (one gold, three silver, and four bronze), a vast improvement on the nation's overall medal count from the 2012 Summer Olympics in London. Five of these medals were awarded to the wrestlers, including a sole golden glory from double world champion Taha Akgül in the men's super heavyweight freestyle (125 kg), and a runner-up feat from reigning world and multiple-time European champion Rıza Kayaalp in the Greco-Roman side, despite his failed attempt to avert a historic golden "three-peat" set forth by his Cuban rival Mijaín López.

Apart from the wrestlers, three Turkish athletes collected the rest of the country's medals in their respective individual sports. Among them were Cuban-born track sprinter Yasmani Copello in the men's 400 m hurdles, taekwondo fighter Nur Tatar in the women's welterweight division (67 kg), and Turkmen-born weightlifter Daniyar İsmayilov, who ended the country's momentary medal drought in his signature sport with a scintillating silver in the men's 69 kg category.

Medalists

| width=78% align=left valign=top |

| width=22% align=left valign=top |

Competitors
The Turkish Olympic Committee fielded a roster of 103 athletes, 55 men and 48 women, to compete across twenty-one different sports at these Games; it was the nation's second-largest delegation sent to the Olympics, relatively smaller by eleven athletes than in London four years earlier. Women's basketball was the only collective sport in which Turkey qualified for the Games, having returned to the Olympic scene for the second straight time. These Games also witnessed several Turkish athletes compete for the first time in the women's modern pentathlon, as well as in equestrian jumping (1960) and fencing (1984) after long years of absence.

Track and field accounted for the most number of athletes on the Turkish team by an individual-based sport, with 31 entries (20 men and 11 women). There was only a single competitor each in badminton, sprint kayaking, equestrian jumping, fencing, modern pentathlon, and tennis.

The Turkish roster featured all three medalists returning from London 2012, namely taekwondo fighters Nur Tatar (women's 67 kg) and defending titleholder Servet Tazegül (men's 68 kg), and Greco-Roman wrestler Rıza Kayaalp, who entered his third straight Games as the reigning world champion, a multiple-time European champion, and a top medal favorite in the super heavyweight category. Because of his sporting successes, Kayaalp was nominated by TMOK to become the country's flag bearer in the opening ceremony.

Nearly a quarter of the Turkish athletes representing at these Games were born in the overseas, with several of them coming from Africa and former Soviet nations. Among the foreign-born athletes were track sprinters Jak Ali Harvey (Jamaica) and Ramil Guliyev (Azerbaijan), track hurdler Yasmani Copello (Cuba), breaststroke swimmer and four-time world junior champion Zeynep Güneş (Ukraine), three-time Olympians Melek Hu (table tennis player, China) and Karin Melis Mey (long jumper, South Africa), and world-ranked weightlifter Daniyar İsmayilov (Turkmenistan).

Other notable athletes on the Turkish squad included sailing brothers Ateş and Deniz Çınar in the men's 470 class, double world champion and top medal favorite Taha Akgül in the men's super heavyweight freestyle (125 kg), and hammer thrower and 2004 bronze medalist Eşref Apak, who headed the roster as the lone competitor going to his fourth straight Olympics. Seventeen-year-old gymnast Tutya Yılmaz was Turkey's youngest athlete of the Games, with pistol shooter and three-time Olympian Yusuf Dikeç rounding out the field as the oldest competitor (aged 43).

| width=78% align=left valign=top |

Archery

One Turkish archer has qualified each for the men's and women's individual recurve at the Olympics by securing one of three available Olympic spots at the 2016 European Championships in Nottingham, Great Britain.

Athletics

Turkish athletes have so far achieved qualifying standards in the following athletics events (up to a maximum of 3 athletes in each event):

Track & road events
Men

Women

Field events

Badminton

Turkey has qualified one badminton player for the women's singles into the Olympic tournament. Özge Bayrak had claimed her Olympic spot as one of top 34 individual shuttlers in the BWF World Rankings as of 5 May 2016.

Basketball

Women's tournament

Turkey women's basketball team qualified for the Olympics with a quarterfinal victory at the 2016 FIBA World Olympic Qualifying Tournament in Nantes, France.

Team roster

Group play

Quarter-final

Boxing

Turkey has entered five boxers to compete in the following weight classes into the Olympic boxing tournament. Onur Şipal became the first Turkish boxer to be selected to the Olympic team with a top two finish of his respective weight division in the AIBA Pro Boxing series. Meanwhile, three further boxers (Gozgec, Ünal, and Demirezen) had claimed their Olympic spots with box-off victories at the 2016 European Qualification Tournament in Samsun.

London 2012 Olympian Selçuk Eker secured an additional Olympic place on the Turkish roster at the 2016 AIBA World Qualifying Tournament in Baku, Azerbaijan, while Şipal's younger brother Önder completed the boxing lineup with his box-off triumph at the 2016 APB and WSB Olympic Qualifier in Vargas, Venezuela.

Canoeing

Sprint
Turkish canoeists have qualified one boat in each of the following events through the 2015 ICF Canoe Sprint World Championships.

Qualification Legend: FA = Qualify to final (medal); FB = Qualify to final B (non-medal)

Cycling

Road
Turkish riders qualified for a maximum of two quota places in the men's Olympic road race by virtue of their top 15 final national ranking in the 2015 UCI Europe Tour.

Equestrian

Turkey has entered one jumping rider into the Olympic equestrian competition by virtue of a top national finish from Central & Eastern Europe in the individual FEI Olympic Rankings. This signified the nation's Olympic return to the sport for the first time since 1960.

Jumping

Fencing

Turkey has entered one fencer into the Olympic competition, signifying the nation's sporting comeback for the first time since 1984. İrem Karamete had claimed her Olympic spot in the women's foil by finishing among the top four individuals at the European Zonal Qualifier in Prague, Czech Republic.

Gymnastics

Artistic
Turkey has entered two artistic gymnasts into the Olympic competition. Ferhat Arican and Tutya Yılmaz had claimed their Olympic spots each in the men's and women's apparatus and all-around events, respectively, at the Olympic Test Event in Rio de Janeiro.

Men

Women

Judo

Turkey has qualified a total of four judokas for the following weight classes at the Games. London 2012 Olympian Bekir Özlü (previously competed for Georgia), Dilara Lokmanhekim, and Kayra Sayit were ranked among the top 22 eligible judokas for men and top 14 for women in the IJF World Ranking List of May 30, 2016, while Büşra Katipoğlu at women's half-middleweight (63 kg) earned a continental quota spot from the European region, as the highest-ranked Turkish judoka outside of direct qualifying position.

Modern pentathlon

Turkey has received an invitation from UIPM to send İlke Özyüksel in the women's modern pentathlon to the Olympics for the first time, as one of the next highest-ranked individuals, not yet qualified, in the World Rankings as of June 1, 2016.

Rowing

Turkey has qualified one boat in the men's lightweight double sculls for the Olympics by virtue of a top two finish at the 2016 European & Final Qualification Regatta in Lucerne, Switzerland.

Qualification Legend: FA=Final A (medal); FB=Final B (non-medal); FC=Final C (non-medal); FD=Final D (non-medal); FE=Final E (non-medal); FF=Final F (non-medal); SA/B=Semifinals A/B; SC/D=Semifinals C/D; SE/F=Semifinals E/F; QF=Quarterfinals; R=Repechage

Sailing

Turkish sailors have qualified one boat in each of the following classes through the individual fleet World Championships, and European qualifying regattas.

London 2012 Olympians Alican Kaynar, Nazlı Çağla Dönertaş, and brothers Ateş Çınar and Deniz Çınar were selected to the Olympic roster under the qualifying merit. Windsurfers Dilara Uralp and Onur Cavit Biriz were added to Turkey's sailing lineup for the Games on June 24, 2016, after the nation received spare Olympic berths freed up by New Zealand and Canada, respectively, from the International Sailing Federation.

M = Medal race; EL = Eliminated – did not advance into the medal race

Shooting

Turkish shooters have achieved quota places for the following events by virtue of their best finishes at the 2014 and 2015 ISSF World Championships, the 2015 ISSF World Cup series, and European Championships or Games, as long as they obtained a minimum qualifying score (MQS) by March 31, 2016.

Qualification Legend: Q = Qualify for the next round; q = Qualify for the bronze medal (shotgun)

Swimming

Turkish swimmers have so far achieved qualifying standards in the following events (up to a maximum of 2 swimmers in each event at the Olympic Qualifying Time (OQT), and potentially 1 at the Olympic Selection Time (OST)):

Table tennis

Turkey has entered one athlete into the table tennis competition at the Games. Two-time Olympian Melek Hu secured one of ten available Olympic spots in the women's singles by winning the group final match at the European Qualification Tournament in Halmstad, Sweden. Meanwhile, Ahmet Li was automatically selected among the top 22 eligible players in the men's singles based on the ITTF Olympic Rankings.

Taekwondo

Turkey entered two athletes into the taekwondo competition at the Olympics. 2012 Olympic featherweight champion Servet Tazegül and silver medalist Nur Tatar qualified automatically for their respective weight classes by finishing in the top 6 WTF Olympic rankings.

Tennis

Turkey has entered one tennis player into the Olympic tournament. Due to the withdrawal of several tennis players from the Games, Çağla Büyükakçay (world no. 77) received a spare ITF Olympic place to compete in the women's singles, as the next highest-ranked eligible player, not yet qualified, in the WTA World Rankings as of June 6, 2016.

Weightlifting

Turkish weightlifters have qualified three women's quota places for the Rio Olympics based on their combined team standing by points at the 2014 and 2015 IWF World Championships. A single men's Olympic spot had been added to the Turkish roster by virtue of a top seven national finish at the 2016 European Championships. The team must allocate these places to individual athletes by June 20, 2016.

Wrestling

Turkey has qualified a total of fourteen wrestlers for each of the following weight classes into the Olympic competition. Four of them finished among the top six to book Olympic spots in the men's freestyle (86 & 125 kg), men's Greco-Roman 130 kg, and women's freestyle 58 kg at the 2015 World Championships, while three additional licenses were awarded to Turkish wrestlers, who progressed to the top two finals at the 2016 European Qualification Tournament.

The remaining half of the Turkish roster secured their Olympic places to complete the wrestling line-up in separate World Qualification Tournaments; three of them at the initial meet in Ulaanbaatar and four more at the final meet in Istanbul.

See also
Turkey at the 2016 Summer Paralympics

References

External links 

 

Olympics
Nations at the 2016 Summer Olympics
2016